Ryan Raybould (born May 30, 1983 in Leawood, Kansas) is an American former soccer player who played as a midfielder for the Gefle IF of Allsvenskan in Sweden.

He signed a developmental contract with the Wizards on March 11, 2005. He appeared in 19 games. After four seasons in MLS, Raybould signed a contract with Swedish club Gefle IF during the summer 2008. His stint in Gefle was a short one, Raybould only played four games in the Swedish top tier league, and he resigned a year later.

After retiring from professional soccer Raybould studied law at Notre Dame Law School. After graduating, he has worked as a federal prosecutor in the U.S. Justice Department. As of August 27, 2018 Raybould is an Assistant United States Attorney at the Dallas Criminal Division.

His sister, Alison, played soccer at Columbia University and was a contestant on Survivor: David vs. Goliath.

References

External links
 Ryan Raybould profile at MLSNet

1983 births
Living people
American soccer players
American expatriate soccer players
Expatriate footballers in Sweden
Kansas City Brass players
Sporting Kansas City players
Sandvikens IF players
Gefle IF players
Yale Bulldogs men's soccer players
Soccer players from Kansas
USL League Two players
Major League Soccer players
Allsvenskan players
Association football midfielders
Association football defenders